District I is the name of a historic district comprising five historic hotels in downtown Kansas City, Missouri listed on the National Register of Historic Places (NRHP) in 1983.

The district's five hotels are
 Dixon Hotel (1912), designed by Sanneman & Van Trump
 Aladdin Hotel, known in 1983 as Embassy on the Park, a 16-story building
 Hotel Muehlebach (1915), known in 1983 as Radisson Muehlebach Hotel
 New Yorker Hotel
 Hotel Phillips

In addition to the district, two other hotels were individually listed on the National Register at the same time:
 Continental Hotel (1923), 106 West 11th Street, a 23-story building that was built as Kansas City Athletic Club.  Known also as Hotel Kansas Citian.
 President Hotel

References

National Register of Historic Places in Kansas City, Missouri
Hotel buildings on the National Register of Historic Places in Missouri
Historic districts on the National Register of Historic Places in Missouri